MV Hero was a roll-on/roll-off cargo ferry which sunk in the North Sea in bad weather in November 1977, with the loss of one crew member, when the stern door lost watertight integrity. The Hero′s pumps could not remove the volumes of water.

References

Ferries
Maritime incidents in 1977
Shipwrecks in the North Sea